The Under Secretary for Economic Growth, Energy, and the Environment is an undersecretary position within the United States Department of State. The Under Secretary for Economic Growth, Energy, and the Environment serves as senior economic advisor at the State Department and advises the Secretary of State on international economic policy and is often referred to as the senior economic diplomat of the United States. The Under Secretary also leads the work of the Department on trade, agriculture, aviation, and bilateral trade relations with America's economic partners.

The position is called the “E” within the government. Responsibilities include international trade and investment policy; international finance, development, and debt policy; economic sanctions and combating terrorist financing; international energy security policy; international telecommunications and transportation policies; support for U.S. businesses, and economic policy analysis, public diplomacy and private sector outreach. The E also serves as the Privacy Shield ombudsperson.

History
An Act of Congress first authorized an Under Secretary of State for Economic Affairs on August 1, 1946, for a 2-year period as the third-ranking officer in the Department. The position was not renewed, however, and between 1947 and 1958 the ranking officer in the Department handling foreign economic matters was either a Deputy Under Secretary or an Assistant Secretary of State. On June 30, 1958, Congress re-established the position of Under Secretary for Economic Affairs in the Mutual Security Act. The following year, the Department of State Organization Act of July 30, 1959, authorized the President to appoint either an Under Secretary for Political Affairs or an Under Secretary for Economic Affairs.

Between 1959 and 1972, during periods when there was no Under Secretary of State for Economic Affairs, the ranking officer for foreign economic affairs was again either a Deputy Under Secretary or an Assistant Secretary of State. On July 13, 1972, Congress established separate and permanent positions at the Under Secretary of State level for Economic Affairs and for Political Affairs, in the Foreign Relations Authorization Act. On August 16, 1985, Congress changed the title to include Agricultural Affairs. The Under Secretary for Economic and Agricultural Affairs serves as the principal adviser to the Secretary and Deputy Secretary (previously Under Secretary) on matters relating to foreign economic and commercial policy. Specified duties, responsibilities, and assignments have varied over time. Each incumbent is commissioned with a functional designation as part of his title. On May 12, 1994, the title was changed to Under Secretary of State for Economic, Business, and Agricultural Affairs. It was changed again in 2011 to Under Secretary for Economic Growth, Energy, and the Environment after the reorganization of the EEB bureau to EB, and the spin off of two new bureaus under the Under Secretary.

As of 2019, the E is also charged with advancing the State Department's economic development agenda; elevating and intensifying the Department's efforts related to energy security, clean energy, and environmental sustainability; and fostering innovation through robust science, entrepreneurship, and technology policies. The E covers issues that reach from the vastness of space, through the Office of Space Affairs, to the depths of the oceans with the goal of advancing U.S. strategic interests through policy aimed at ensuring that economic growth and a healthy planet go hand in hand.

List of Under Secretaries of State for Economic Affairs, 1946–1985

List of Under Secretaries of State for Economic and Agricultural Affairs, 1985–1994
The office of Under Secretary of State for Economic Affairs was renamed the Under Secretary of State for Economic and Agricultural Affairs on August 16, 1985.

List of Under Secretaries of State for Economic, Business, and Agricultural Affairs, 1994–2011
The office of Under Secretary of State for Economic and Agricultural Affairs was renamed the Under Secretary of State for Economic, Business, and Agricultural Affairs on May 12, 1994.

List of Under Secretaries of State for Economic Growth, Energy, and the Environment, 2011–present
The office of Under Secretary of State for Economic, Business, and Agricultural Affairs was renamed the Under Secretary of State for Economic Growth, Energy, and the Environment on December 8, 2011.

References

External links
The government website of the Under Secretary of State for Economic Growth, Energy, and the Environment
The Office of the Historian's history of the position, and list of former Under Secretaries

 
1946 establishments in Washington, D.C.
United States economic policy
Energy policy of the United States
Environmental policy in the United States
United States diplomacy